Somdev Devvarman was the defending champion but decided not to participate.

5th seed Lukáš Lacko won the title, defeating 1st seed Marsel İlhan 6–4, 6–3 in the final.

Seeds

Draw

Finals

Top half

Bottom half

References
 Main draw
 Qualifying draw

Singles